Volker Halbach (born 21 October 1965 in Ingolstadt, Germany) is a German logician and philosopher. His main research interests are in philosophical logic, philosophy of mathematics, philosophy of language, and epistemology, with a focus on formal theories of truth. He is Professor of Philosophy at the University of Oxford, Tutorial Fellow of New College, Oxford.

Education and career 
Volker Halbach's philosophical studies began at Ludwig-Maximilians-Universität München. He graduated in 1991 with an M.A. (Master of Arts) and in 1994 with a doctorate in philosophy (D.Phil., summa cum laude) with a dissertation titled "Tarski-Hierarchien". In 2001 he earned his habilitation with a thesis on "Semantics and Deflationism".

Halbach was an assistant professor at Universität Konstanz (1997-2004).

In 2004, he took up at role at New College, University of Oxford, where he teaches logic-related courses including Introduction to Logic and Elements of Deductive Logic in the first year, Philosophical Logic, Formal Logic, Philosophy of Logic & Language, and Philosophy of Mathematics.

Philosophical work 
Halbach is author of several articles and books including The Logic Manual, a textbook on undergraduate logic, and Axiomatic Theories of Truth.

References

External links 
 Interview at 3AM Magazine

German logicians
21st-century German philosophers
Philosophers of mathematics
German male writers
1965 births
Living people
Fellows of New College, Oxford
Ludwig Maximilian University of Munich alumni
University of Florence alumni
Academic staff of the University of Konstanz